The Academy Awards, also known as the Oscars, are awards for artistic and technical merit for the film industry. They are presented annually by the Academy of Motion Picture Arts and Sciences (AMPAS), in recognition of excellence in cinematic achievements as assessed by the Academy's voting membership. The Academy Awards are regarded by many as the most prestigious, significant awards in the entertainment industry in the United States and worldwide. The Oscar statuette depicts a knight rendered in the Art Deco style.

The major award categories are presented during a live televised Hollywood ceremony that is typically held in February or March. It is the oldest worldwide entertainment awards ceremony. The 1st Academy Awards were held in 1929, the second ceremony in 1930 was the first one broadcast by radio, and the 1953 ceremony was the first one televised. It is also the oldest of the four major annual American entertainment awards; its equivalents – the Emmy Awards for television, the Tony Awards for theater, and the Grammy Awards for music – are modeled after the Academy Awards.

History
The first Academy Awards presentation was held on May 16, 1929, at a private dinner function at The Hollywood Roosevelt Hotel with an audience of about 270 people.

The post-awards party was held at the Mayfair Hotel. The cost of guest tickets for that night's ceremony was $5 ($ at 2020 prices). Fifteen statuettes were awarded, honoring artists, directors and other participants in the film-making industry of the time, for their works during the 1927–28 period. The ceremony ran for 15 minutes.

For this first ceremony, winners were announced to the media three months earlier. For the second ceremony in 1930, and the rest of the first decade, the results were given to newspapers for publication at 11:00 pm on the night of the awards. In 1940, the Los Angeles Times announced the winners before the ceremony began; as a result, the following year the Academy started using a sealed envelope to reveal the names of the winners.

The term "Oscar" is a registered trademark of the AMPAS; however, in the Italian language, it is used generically to refer to any award or award ceremony, regardless of which field.

Milestones
The first Best Actor awarded was Emil Jannings, for his performances in The Last Command and The Way of All Flesh. He had to return to Europe before the ceremony, so the Academy agreed to give him the prize earlier; this made him the first Academy Award winner in history. At that time, winners were recognized for the entirety of their work done in a certain category during the qualifying period; for example, Jannings received the award for two movies in which he starred during that period, and Janet Gaynor later won a single Oscar for performances in three films. With the fourth ceremony, however, the system changed, and professionals were honored for a specific performance in a single film. For the first six ceremonies, the eligibility period spanned two calendar years.

At the 29th ceremony, held in 1957, the Best Foreign Language Film category, now known as Best International Feature Film, was introduced. Until then, foreign-language films had been honored with the Special Achievement Award.

Perhaps the most widely seen streaker in history was 34-year-old Robert Opel, who streaked across the stage of The Dorothy Chandler Pavilion in Los Angeles flashing a peace sign on national US television at the 46th Academy Awards in 1974. Bemused host David Niven quipped, "Isn't it fascinating to think that probably the only laugh that man will ever get in his life is by stripping off and showing his shortcomings?" Later, evidence arose suggesting that Opel's appearance was facilitated as a publicity stunt by the show's producer Jack Haley Jr..

Robert Metzler, the show's business manager, believed that the incident had been planned in some way; during the dress rehearsal Niven had asked Metzler's wife to borrow a pen so he could write down the famous line, which was thus not the ad-lib it appeared to be.

The 74th Academy Awards, held in 2002, presented the first Academy Award for Best Animated Feature.

From 1973 to 2020 and since 2022, all Academy Awards ceremonies have ended with the Academy Award for Best Picture. For 2021, this tradition was broken as the ceremony ended with the Academy Award for Best Actor.

Traditionally, the previous year's winner for Best Actor and Best Supporting Actor present the awards for Best Actress and Best Supporting Actress, while the previous year's winner for Best Actress and Best Supporting Actress present the awards for Best Actor and Best Supporting Actor.

On February 9, 2020, Parasite became the first foreign-language film to win Best Picture at the award ceremony of 92nd Academy Awards.

Tom Hanks announced at the 2020 Oscar Ceremony, the opening of the Academy Museum of Motion Pictures on December 14, 2020. The museum development started in 2017 under Kerry Brougher, but is now led by Bill Kramer. The industry-curated exhibits are geared toward the history of motion pictures and the art & science of film making, exhibiting trailblazing directors, actors, film-makers, sound editors and more, and the museum houses famous artifacts from acclaimed movies such as Dorothy's Ruby Red Slippers from The Wizard of Oz.

The 93rd Academy Awards ceremony, honoring the best films of 2020 and early 2021, was held on April 25, 2021, after it was postponed from its original February 28, 2021, schedule due to the impact of the COVID-19 pandemic on cinema. As with the two previous ceremonies, there was no host. The ceremony was broadcast on ABC. It took place at the Dolby Theatre in Los Angeles, California for the 19th consecutive year, along with satellite location taking place at the Union Station also in Los Angeles. Because of the virus impact on films and TV industries, Academy president David Rubin and CEO Dawn Hudson announced that for the 2021 Oscar Ceremony, streaming movies not shown in theaters would be eligible, though at some point the requirement that movies be shown in theaters would return.

Oscar statuette

Academy Award of Merit

The best known award is the Academy Award of Merit, more popularly known as the Oscar statuette. Made of gold-plated bronze on a black metal base, it is 13.5 in (34.3 cm) tall, weighs 8.5 lb (3.856 kg), and depicts a knight rendered in Art Deco style holding a sword standing on a reel of film with five spokes. The five spokes represent the original branches of the Academy: Actors, Writers, Directors, Producers, and Technicians.

Sculptor George Stanley (who also did the Muse Fountain at the Hollywood Bowl) sculpted Cedric Gibbons' design. The statuettes presented at the initial ceremonies were gold-plated solid bronze. Within a few years, the bronze was abandoned in favor of Britannia metal, a pewter-like alloy which is then plated in copper, nickel silver, and finally, 24-karat gold. Due to a metal shortage during World War II, Oscars were made of painted plaster for three years. Following the war, the Academy invited recipients to redeem the plaster figures for gold-plated metal ones. The only addition to the Oscar since it was created is a minor streamlining of the base. The original Oscar mold was cast in 1928 at the C.W. Shumway & Sons Foundry in Batavia, Illinois, which also contributed to casting the molds for the Vince Lombardi Trophy and Emmy Award statuettes. From 1983 to 2015, approximately 50 Oscars in a tin alloy with gold plating were made each year in Chicago by Illinois manufacturer R.S. Owens & Company. It would take between three and four weeks to manufacture 50 statuettes. In 2016, the Academy returned to bronze as the core metal of the statuettes, handing manufacturing duties to Walden, New York-based Polich Tallix Fine Art Foundry, now owned and operated by UAP Urban Art Projects. While based on a digital scan of an original 1929 Oscar, the statuettes retain their modern-era dimensions and black pedestal. Cast in liquid bronze from 3D-printed ceramic molds and polished, they are then electroplated in 24-karat gold by Brooklyn, New York–based Epner Technology. The time required to produce 50 such statuettes is roughly three months. R.S. Owens is expected to continue producing other awards for the Academy and service existing Oscars that need replating.

Naming
The Academy officially adopted the name "Oscar" for the trophies in 1939. However, the origin of the nickname is disputed.

One biography of Bette Davis, who was a president of the Academy in 1941, claims she named the award after her first husband, band leader Harmon Oscar Nelson. A frequently mentioned originator is Margaret Herrick, the Academy executive director, who, when she first saw the award in 1931, said the statuette reminded her of "Uncle Oscar", a nickname for her cousin Oscar Pierce.

Columnist Sidney Skolsky, who was present during Herrick's naming in 1931, wrote that "Employees have affectionately dubbed their famous statuette 'Oscar'." The Academy credits Skolsky with "the first confirmed newspaper reference" to Oscar in his column on March 16, 1934, which was written about that year's 6th Academy Awards. The 1934 awards appeared again in another early media mention of Oscar: a Time magazine story. In the ceremonies that year, Walt Disney was the first person to use the term "Oscar" while giving an acceptance speech.

Bruce Davis, in preparing a history of the awards for his book The Academy and the Award, found that the term "Oscar" had come from Eleanore Lilleberg, a secretary at the Academy when the award was first introduced, as she had been in charge of pre-ceremony handling of the awards. Davis found in an autobiography of Einar Lilleberg, Eleanore's brother, that Einar had referenced a Norwegian army veteran named Oscar the two knew in Chicago, who Einar described as having always "stood straight and tall."

In 2021, Brazilian researcher Dr. Waldemar Dalenogare found what may have been the first public mention of the name "Oscar", in journalist Relman Morin's column "Cinematters" in the Los Angeles Evening Post-Record on December 5, 1933. As no award ceremony took place that year, Morin wrote: "What's happened to the annual Academy banquet? As a rule, the banquet and the awarding of 'Oscar,' the bronze statuette given for best performances, is all over long before this."

Engraving
To prevent information identifying the Oscar winners from leaking ahead of the ceremony, Oscar statuettes presented at the ceremony have blank baseplates. Until 2010, winners returned their statuettes to the Academy and had to wait several weeks to have their names inscribed on their respective Oscars. Since 2010, winners have had the option of having engraved nameplates applied to their statuettes at an inscription-processing station at the Governor's Ball, a party held immediately after the Oscar ceremony. The R.S. Owens company has engraved nameplates made before the ceremony, bearing the name of every potential winner. The nameplates for the non-winning nominees are later recycled.

Ownership of Oscar statuettes
Prior to 1950, Oscar statuettes were (and remain) the property of the recipient. Since then the statuettes have been legally encumbered by the requirement that the statuette be first offered for sale back to the Academy for US$1. If a winner refuses to agree to this stipulation, then the Academy keeps the statuette. Academy Awards predating this agreement have been sold in public auctions and private deals for six-figure sums.

In 1989, Michael Todd's grandson tried to sell Todd's Best Picture Oscar for his 1956 production of Around the World in 80 Days to a movie prop collector. The Academy earned enforcement of its statuette contract by gaining a permanent injunction against the sale.

In 1992, Harold Russell consigned his 1946 Oscar for Best Supporting Actor for The Best Years of Our Lives to auction to raise money for his wife's medical expenses. Though his decision caused controversy, the first-ever Oscar to be sold passed to a private collector on August 6, 1992 for $60,500 ($ today). Russell defended his action, saying, "I don't know why anybody would be critical. My wife's health is much more important than sentimental reasons. The movie will be here, even if Oscar isn't."

In December 2011, Orson Welles' 1941 Oscar for Citizen Kane (Academy Award for Best Original Screenplay) was put up for auction, after his heirs won a 2004 court decision contending that Welles did not sign any agreement to return the statue to the Academy. On December 20, 2011, it sold in an online auction for US$861,542 ($ today).

Some buyers have subsequently returned the statuettes to the Academy, which keeps them in its treasury.

Other awards presented by the Academy

In addition to the Academy Award of Merit (Oscar award), there are nine honorary (non-competitive) awards presented by the Academy from time to time (except for the Academy Honorary Award, the Technical Achievement Award, and the Student Academy Awards, which are presented annually):
 Governors Awards:
 The Academy Honorary Award (annual) (which may or may not be in the form of an Oscar statuette); 
 The Irving G. Thalberg Memorial Award (since 1938) (in the form of a bust of Thalberg);
 The Jean Hersholt Humanitarian Award (since 1957) (in the form of an Oscar statuette); 
 The Academy Scientific and Technical Awards:
 Academy Award of Merit (non-competitive) (in the form of an Oscar statuette);
 Scientific and Engineering Award (in the form of a bronze tablet);
 Technical Achievement Award (annual) (in the form of a certificate);
 The John A. Bonner Medal of Commendation (since 1978) (in the form of a medal);
 The Gordon E. Sawyer Award (since 1982); and
 The Academy Student Academy Awards (annual).

The Academy also awards Nicholl Fellowships in Screenwriting.

Nomination
From 2004 to 2020, the Academy Award nomination results were announced to the public in mid-January. Prior to that, the results were announced in early February. In 2021, the nominees were announced in March. In 2022, the nominees were announced in early February for the first time since 2003.

Voters
The Academy of Motion Picture Arts and Sciences (AMPAS), a professional honorary organization, maintains a voting membership of over 7,000 .

Academy membership is divided into different branches, with each representing a different discipline in film production. Actors constitute the largest voting bloc, numbering 1,311 members (22 percent) of the Academy's composition. Votes have been certified by the auditing firm PricewaterhouseCoopers (and its predecessor Price Waterhouse) since the 7th Academy Awards in 1935. The firm mails the ballots of eligible nominees to members of the Academy in December to reflect the previous eligible year with a due date sometime in January of the next year, then tabulates the votes in a process that takes thousands of hours.

All AMPAS members must be invited to join by the Board of Governors, on behalf of Academy Branch Executive Committees. Membership eligibility may be achieved by a competitive nomination or a member may submit a name based on other significant contributions to the field of motion pictures.

New membership proposals are considered annually. The Academy does not publicly disclose its membership, although as recently as 2007 press releases have announced the names of those who have been invited to join. The 2007 release also stated that it has just under 6,000 voting members. While the membership had been growing, stricter policies have kept its size steady since then.

In 2012, the results of a study conducted by the Los Angeles Times were published describing the demographic breakdown of approximately 88% of AMPAS' voting membership. Of the 5,100+ active voters confirmed, 94% were Caucasian, 77% were male, and 54% were found to be over the age of 60. 33% of voting members are former nominees (14%) and winners (19%).

In May 2011, the Academy sent a letter advising its 6,000 or so voting members that an online system for Oscar voting would be implemented in 2013.

Rules
According to Rules 2 and 3 of the official Academy Awards Rules, a film must open in the previous calendar year, from midnight at the start of January 1 to midnight at the end of December 31, in Los Angeles County, California, and play for seven consecutive days, to qualify (except for the Best International Feature Film, Best Documentary Feature, and awards in short film categories). Additionally, the film must be shown at least three times on each day of its qualifying run, with at least one of the daily showings starting between 6 pm and 10 pm local time.

For example, the 2009 Best Picture winner, The Hurt Locker, was originally first released in 2008, but did not qualify for the 2008 awards, as it did not play its Oscar-qualifying run in Los Angeles until mid-2009, thus qualifying for the 2009 awards. Foreign films must include English subtitles, and each country can submit only one film for consideration in the International Feature Film category per year.

Rule 2 states that a film must be feature-length, defined as a minimum of 40 minutes, except for short-subject awards, and it must exist either on a 35 mm or 70 mm film print or in 24 frame/s or 48 frame/s progressive scan digital cinema format with a minimum projector resolution of 2048 by 1080 pixels. Since the 90th Academy Awards, presented in 2018, multi-part and limited series have been ineligible for the Best Documentary Feature award. This followed the win of O.J.: Made in America, an eight-hour presentation that was screened in a limited release before being broadcast in five parts on ABC and ESPN, in that category in 2017. The Academy's announcement of the new rule made no direct mention of that film.

The Best International Feature Film award does not require a U.S. release. It requires the film to be submitted as its country's official selection.

The Best Documentary Feature award requires either week-long releases in both Los Angeles County and New York City during the previous calendar year, or a qualifying award at a competitive film festival from the Documentary Feature Qualifying Festival list (regardless of any public exhibition or distribution), or submission in the International Feature Film category as its country's official selection. The qualifying theatrical runs must meet the same requirements as those for non-documentary films regarding numbers and times of screenings. Additionally, a film must have been reviewed by a critic from The New York Times, Time Out New York, the Los Angeles Times, or LA Weekly.

Producers must submit an Official Screen Credits online form before the deadline; in case it is not submitted by the defined deadline, the film will be ineligible for Academy Awards in any year. The form includes the production credits for all related categories. Then, each form is checked and put in a Reminder List of Eligible Releases.

Awards in short film categories (Best Documentary Short Subject, Best Animated Short Film, and Best Live Action Short Film) have noticeably different eligibility rules from most other competitive awards. First, the qualifying period for release does not coincide with a calendar year, instead of covering one year starting on October 1 and ending on September 30 of the calendar year before the ceremony. Second, there are multiple methods of qualification. The main method is a week-long theatrical release in either Los Angeles County or New York City during the eligibility period. Films also can qualify by winning specified awards at one of several competitive film festivals designated by the Academy, also without regard to prior public distribution. Finally, a film that is selected as a gold, silver, or bronze medal winner in an appropriate category of the immediately previous Student Academy Awards is also eligible (Documentary category for that award, and Animation, Narrative, Alternative, or International for the other awards). The requirements for the qualifying theatrical run are also different from those for other awards. Only one screening per day is required. For the Documentary award, the screening must start between noon and 10 pm local time; for other awards, no specific start time is required, but the film must appear in regular theater listings with dates and screening times.
In late December, ballots, and copies of the Reminder List of Eligible Releases are mailed to around 6,000 active members. For most categories, members from each of the branches vote to determine the nominees only in their respective categories (i.e. only directors vote for directors, writers for writers, actors for actors, etc.). In the special case of Best Picture, all voting members are eligible to select the nominees. In all major categories, a variant of the single transferable vote is used, with each member casting a ballot with up to five nominees (ten for Best Picture) ranked preferentially. In certain categories, including International Feature Film, Documentary and Animated Feature, nominees are selected by special screening committees made up of members from all branches.

In most categories, the winner is selected from among the nominees by plurality voting of all members. Since 2009, the Best Picture winner has been chosen by instant runoff voting. Since 2013, re-weighted range voting has been used to select the nominees for the Best Visual Effects.

Film companies will spend as much as several million dollars on marketing to awards voters for a movie in the running for Best Picture, in attempts to improve chances of receiving Oscars and other movie awards conferred in Oscar season. The Academy enforces rules to limit overt campaigning by its members to try to eliminate excesses and prevent the process from becoming undignified. It has an awards czar on staff who advises members on allowed practices and levies penalties on offenders. For example, a producer of the 2009 Best Picture nominee The Hurt Locker was disqualified as a producer in the category when he contacted associates urging them to vote for his film and not another that was seen as the front-runner (The Hurt Locker eventually won).

Academy Screening Room
The Academy Screening Room or Academy Digital Screening Room is a secure streaming platform which allows voting members of the Academy to view all eligible films (except, initially, those in the International category) in one place. It was introduced in 2019, for the 2020 Oscars, though DVD screeners and Academy in-person screenings were still provided. For films to be included on the platform, the North American distributor must pay $12,500, including a watermarking fee, and a digital copy of the film to be prepared for streaming by the Academy. The platform can be accessed via Apple TV and Roku players. The watermarking process involved several video security firms, creating a forensic watermark and restricting the ability to take screenshots or screen recordings.

In 2021, for the 2022 Oscars, the Academy banned all physical screeners and in-person screenings, restricting official membership viewing to the Academy Screening Room. Films eligible in the Documentary and International categories were made available in different sections of the platform. Distributors can also pay an extra fee to add video featurettes to promote their films on the platform. The in-person screenings were said to be cancelled because of the COVID-19 pandemic. Eligible films do not have to be added to the platform, but the Academy advertises them to voting members when they are.

Awards ceremonies

Telecast

The major awards are presented at a live televised ceremony, commonly in late February or early March following the relevant calendar year, and six weeks after the announcement of the nominees. It is the culmination of the film awards season, which usually begins during November or December of the previous year. This is an elaborate extravaganza, with the invited guests walking up the red carpet in the creations of the most prominent fashion designers of the day. Black tie dress is the most common outfit for men, although fashion may dictate not wearing a bow-tie, and musical performers sometimes do not adhere to this (the artists who recorded the nominees for Best Original Song quite often perform those songs live at the awards ceremony, and the fact that they are performing is often used to promote the television broadcast).

The Academy Awards is the world's longest-running awards show televised live from the U.S. to all time zones in North America and worldwide, and gathers billions of viewers elsewhere throughout the world. The Oscars were first televised in 1953 by NBC, which continued to broadcast the event until 1960, when ABC took over, televising the festivities (including the first color broadcast of the event in 1966) through 1970. NBC regained the rights for five years  then ABC resumed broadcast duties in 1976 and its current contract with the Academy runs through 2028. The Academy has also produced condensed versions of the ceremony for broadcast in international markets (especially those outside of the Americas) in more desirable local timeslots. The ceremony was broadcast live internationally for the first time via satellite since 1970, but only two South American countries, Chile and Brazil, purchased the rights to air the broadcast. By that time, the television rights to the Academy Awards had been sold in 50 countries. A decade later, the rights were already being sold to 60 countries, and by 1984, the TV rights to the Awards were licensed in 76 countries.

The ceremonies were moved up from late March/early April to late February, since 2004, to help disrupt and shorten the intense lobbying and ad campaigns associated with Oscar season in the film industry. Another reason was because of the growing TV ratings success coinciding with the NCAA basketball tournament, which would cut into the Academy Awards audience. (In 1976 and 1977, ABC's regained Oscars were moved from Tuesday to Monday and went directly opposite NBC's NCAA title game.) The earlier date is also to the advantage of ABC, as it now usually occurs during the highly profitable and important February sweeps period. Some years, the ceremony is moved into the first Sunday of March to avoid a clash with the Winter Olympic Games. Another reason for the move to late February and early March is also to avoid the awards ceremony occurring so close to the religious holidays of Passover and Easter, which for decades had been a grievance from members and the general public. Advertising is somewhat restricted, however, as traditionally no movie studios or competitors of official Academy Award sponsors may advertise during the telecast. The production of the Academy Awards telecast currently holds the distinction of winning the most Emmys in history, with 47 wins and 195 nominations overall since that award's own launch in 1949.

After many years of being held on Mondays at 9:00 pm Eastern/6:00 p.m Pacific, since the 1999 ceremonies, it was moved to Sundays at 8:30 pm ET/5:30 pm PT. The reasons given for the move were that more viewers would tune in on Sundays, that Los Angeles rush-hour traffic jams could be avoided, and an earlier start time would allow viewers on the East Coast to go to bed earlier. For many years the film industry opposed a Sunday broadcast because it would cut into the weekend box office. In 2010, the Academy contemplated moving the ceremony even further back into January, citing TV viewers' fatigue with the film industry's long awards season. However, such an accelerated schedule would dramatically decrease the voting period for its members, to the point where some voters would only have time to view the contending films streamed on their computers (as opposed to traditionally receiving the films and ballots in the mail). Furthermore, a January ceremony on Sunday would clash with National Football League playoff games. In 2018, the Academy announced that the ceremony would be moved from late February to mid February beginning with the 92nd Academy Awards in 2020.

Originally scheduled for April 8, 1968, the 40th Academy Awards ceremony was postponed for two days, because of the assassination of Dr. Martin Luther King, Jr. On March 30, 1981, the 53rd Academy Awards was postponed for one day, after the shooting of President Ronald Reagan and others in Washington, D.C.

In 1993, an In Memoriam segment was introduced, honoring those who had made a significant contribution to cinema who had died in the preceding 12 months, a selection compiled by a small committee of Academy members. This segment has drawn criticism over the years for the omission of some names. Criticism was also levied for many years regarding another aspect, with the segment having a "popularity contest" feel as the audience varied their applause to those who had died by the subject's cultural impact; the applause has since been muted during the telecast, and the audience is discouraged from clapping during the segment and giving silent reflection instead. This segment was later followed by a commercial break.

In terms of broadcast length, the ceremony generally averages three and a half hours. The first Oscars, in 1929, lasted 15 minutes. At the other end of the spectrum, the 2002 ceremony lasted four hours and twenty-three minutes. In 2010, the organizers of the Academy Awards announced winners' acceptance speeches must not run past 45 seconds. This, according to organizer Bill Mechanic, was to ensure the elimination of what he termed "the single most hated thing on the show" – overly long and embarrassing displays of emotion. In 2016, in a further effort to streamline speeches, winners' dedications were displayed on an on-screen ticker. During the 2018 ceremony, host Jimmy Kimmel acknowledged how long the ceremony had become, by announcing that he would give a brand-new jet ski to whoever gave the shortest speech of the night (a reward won by Mark Bridges when accepting his Best Costume Design award for Phantom Thread. The Wall Street Journal analyzed the average minutes spent across the 2014–2018 telecasts as follows: 14 on song performances; 25 on the hosts' speeches; 38 on prerecorded clips; and 78 on the awards themselves, broken into 24 on the introduction and announcement, 24 on winners walking to the stage, and 30 on their acceptance speeches.

Although still dominant in ratings, the viewership of the Academy Awards has steadily dropped; the 88th Academy Awards were the lowest-rated in the past eight years (although with increases in male and 18–49 viewership), while the show itself also faced mixed reception. Following the show, Variety reported that ABC was, in negotiating an extension to its contract to broadcast the Oscars, seeking to have more creative control over the broadcast itself. Currently and nominally, AMPAS is responsible for most aspects of the telecast, including the choice of production staff and hosting, although ABC is allowed to have some input on their decisions. In August 2016, AMPAS extended its contract with ABC through 2028: the contract neither contains any notable changes nor gives ABC any further creative control over the telecast.

TV ratings
Historically, the telecast's viewership is higher when box-office hits are favored to win the Best Picture award. More than 57.25 million viewers tuned to the telecast for the 70th Academy Awards in 1998, the year of Titanic, which generated a box office haul during its initial 1997–98 run of US$600.8 million in the US, a box office record that would remain unsurpassed for years. The 76th Academy Awards ceremony, in which The Lord of the Rings: The Return of the King (pre-telecast box office earnings of US$368 million) received 11 Awards including Best Picture, drew 43.56 million viewers. The most watched ceremony based on Nielsen ratings to date, however, was the 42nd Academy Awards (Best Picture Midnight Cowboy) which drew a 43.4% household rating on April 7, 1970.

By contrast, ceremonies honoring films that have not performed well at the box office tend to show weaker ratings, despite how much critical acclaim those films have received. The 78th Academy Awards which awarded low-budget independent film Crash (with a pre-Oscar gross of US$53.4 million) generated an audience of 38.64 million with a household rating of 22.91%. In 2008, the 80th Academy Awards telecast was watched by 31.76 million viewers on average with an 18.66% household rating, the lowest-rated and least-watched ceremony at the time, in spite of celebrating 80 years of the Academy Awards. The Best Picture winner of that particular ceremony was another independent film (No Country for Old Men).

Whereas the 92nd Academy Awards drew an average of 23.6 million viewers, the 93rd Academy Awards drew an even lower viewership of 10.4 million. That is the lowest viewership recorded by Nielsen since it started recording audience totals in 1974. The 94th and 95th editions drew 16.6 and 18.7 million viewers, still below the audience of the 92nd edition.

Archive
The Academy Film Archive holds copies of every Academy Awards ceremony since the 1949 Oscars and material on many prior ceremonies, along with ancillary material related to more recent shows. Copies are held in a variety of film, video and digital formats.

Broadcasters

Venues
In 1929, the first Academy Awards were presented at a banquet dinner at The Hollywood Roosevelt Hotel. From 1930 to 1943, the ceremony alternated between two venues: the Ambassador Hotel on Wilshire Boulevard and the Biltmore Hotel in downtown Los Angeles.

Grauman's Chinese Theatre in Hollywood then hosted the awards from 1944 to 1946, followed by the Shrine Auditorium in Los Angeles from 1947 to 1948. The 21st Academy Awards in 1949 were held at the Academy Award Theatre at what had been the Academy's headquarters on Melrose Avenue in Hollywood.

From 1950 to 1960, the awards were presented at Hollywood's Pantages Theatre. With the advent of television, the awards from 1953 to 1957 took place simultaneously in Hollywood and New York, first at the NBC International Theatre (1953) and then at the NBC Century Theatre, after which the ceremony took place solely in Los Angeles. The Oscars moved to the Santa Monica Civic Auditorium in Santa Monica, California, in 1961. By 1969, the Academy decided to move the ceremonies back to Downtown Los Angeles, this time to the Dorothy Chandler Pavilion at the Los Angeles County Music Center. In the late 1990s and early 2000s, the ceremony returned to the Shrine.

In 2002, Hollywood's Dolby Theatre (previously known as the Kodak Theatre) became the presentation's current venue.

Awards of Merit categories

Current categories

In the first year of the awards, the Best Directing award was split into two categories (Drama and Comedy). At times, the Best Original Score award has also been split into separate categories (Drama and Comedy/Musical). From the 1930s through the 1960s, the Art Direction (now Production Design), Cinematography, and Costume Design awards were likewise split into two categories (black-and-white films and color films). Prior to 2012, the Production Design award was called Art Direction, while the Makeup and Hairstyling award was called Makeup.

In August 2018, the Academy announced that several categories would not be televised live, but rather be recorded during commercial breaks and aired later in the ceremony.
Following dissent from Academy members, they announced that they would indeed air all 24 categories live. This followed several proposals (among them, the introduction of a Popular Film category) that the Academy had announced but did not implement.

Discontinued categories

Proposed categories
The Board of Governors meets each year and considers new award categories. To date, the following categories have been proposed:
 Best Casting: rejected in 1999
 Best Popular Film: proposed in 2018 for presentation at the 2019 ceremony; postponed until the 2020 ceremony at the earliest (yet to be implemented)
 Best Stunt Coordination: rejected every year from 1991 to 2012
 Best Title Design: rejected in 1999

Special categories
The Special Academy Awards are voted on by special committees, rather than by the Academy membership as a whole. They are not always presented on an annual basis.

Current special categories
 Academy Honorary Award: since 1929
 Academy Scientific and Technical Award (three different awards): since 1931
 Gordon E. Sawyer Award: since 1981
 Jean Hersholt Humanitarian Award: since 1957 
 Irving G. Thalberg Memorial Award: since 1938 
 Academy Special Achievement Award: from 1972 to 1995, and again for 2017

Discontinued special categories
 Academy Juvenile Award: 1934 to 1960

Criticism

Accusations of commercialism
Due to the positive exposure and prestige of the Academy Awards, many studios spend millions of dollars and hire publicists specifically to promote their films during what is typically called the "Oscar season." This has generated accusations of the Academy Awards being influenced more by marketing than by quality. William Friedkin, an Academy Award-winning film director and former producer of the ceremony, expressed this sentiment at a conference in New York in 2009, describing it as "the greatest promotion scheme that any industry ever devised for itself."

Tim Dirks, editor of AMC's filmsite.org, has written of the Academy Awards:

A recent technique that has been claimed to be used during the Oscar season is the whisper campaign. These campaigns are intended to spread negative perceptions of other movies nominated and are believed to be perpetrated by those that were involved in creating the movie. Examples of whisper campaigns include the allegations against Zero Dark Thirty suggesting that it justifies torture and the claim that Lincoln distorts history.

Accusations of bias

Typical criticism of the Academy Awards for Best Picture is that among the winners and nominees there is an over-representation of romantic historical epics, biographical dramas, romantic dramedies and family melodramas, most of which are released in the U.S. in the last three months of the calendar year. The Oscars have been infamously known for selecting specific genres of movies to be awarded. The term "Oscar bait" was coined to describe such movies. This has led, at times, to more specific criticisms that the Academy is disconnected from the audience, e.g., by favoring "Oscar bait" over audience favorites or favoring historical melodramas over critically acclaimed movies that depict current life issues.

Allegations of a lack of diversity
The Academy Awards have long received criticism over its lack of diversity among the nominees. This criticism is based on the statistics from every Academy Awards since 1929, which show that only 6.4% of academy award nominees have been non-white and since 1991, 11.2% of nominees have been non-white, with the rate of winners being even more polarizing. Due to a variety of reasons, including marketability and historical bans on interracial couples, a number of high-profile Oscars have been given to yellowface portrayals, as well as performances of Asian characters rewritten for white characters. It took until 2023 for an Asian woman to win an Academy Award for Best Actress, when Michelle Yeoh received the award for her performance in Everything Everywhere All at Once. The 88th awards ceremony became the target of a boycott, popularized on social media with the hashtag #OscarsSoWhite, based on activists' perception that its all-white acting nominee list reflected bias. In response, the Academy initiated "historic" changes in membership by 2020. Media critics find the Academy's efforts to address its racial, gender and national biases are merely distractions, especially since they continue to ignore Asian performers. By contrast, the Golden Globe Awards already have multiple winners of Asian descent in leading actress categories. Some question whether the Academy's definition of "merit" is just or empowering for non-Americans.

Miscategorization of actors

The Academy doesn't have any rules for how to categorize whether a performance is leading or supporting, and it is up to the discretion of the studios whether a given performance is submitted for either Best Actor/Actress or Best Supporting Actor/Actress. This has led situations where a film has two or more co-leads, and one of these is submitted in a supporting category to avoid the two leads competing against each other, and to increase the film's chances of winning. This practice has been derisively called "category fraud". For example, Rooney Mara was nominated for Best Supporting Actress for Carol (2015), despite her having a comparable amount of screentime to Cate Blanchett, who was nominated for Best Actress. Another example is Once Upon a Time in Hollywood (2019), where Brad Pitt was nominated for and won Best Supporting Actor, even though he played an equally important role to Best Actor nominee Leonardo DiCaprio. In both these cases, critics argued that The Weinstein Company, the studio behind both films, had placed someone who was actually a leading actor or actress into the supporting categories to avoid them competing against their co-lead.

Symbolism or sentimentalization
Acting prizes in certain years have been criticized for not recognizing superior performances so much as being awarded for personal popularity, to make up for a "snub" for a work that proved in time to be more popular or renowned than the one awarded, or presented as a "career honor" to recognize a distinguished nominee's entire body of work.

Recognition of streaming media film
Following the 91st Academy Awards in February 2019 in which the Netflix-broadcast film Roma had been nominated for ten awards including the Best Picture category, Steven Spielberg and other members of the Academy discussed changing the requirements through the Board of Governors for films as to exclude those from Netflix and other media streaming services. Spielberg had been concerned that Netflix as a movie production and distribution studio could spend much more than typical Oscar-winning films and have much wider and earlier distribution than other Best Picture-nominated films, while still being able to meet the minimal theatrical-run status to qualify for an Oscar. The United States Department of Justice, having heard of this potential rule change, wrote a letter to the Academy in March 2019, cautioning them that placing additional restrictions on films that originate from streaming media services without proper justification could raise anti-trust concerns against the Academy. Following its April 2019 board meeting, the Academy Board of Governors agreed to retain the current rules that allow for streaming media films to be eligible for Oscars as long as they enjoy limited theatrical runs.

2022 Will Smith and Chris Rock slapping incident

During the 94th Academy Awards on March 27, 2022, Chris Rock joked about Jada Pinkett Smith's shaved head, with a G.I. Jane reference. Will Smith walked onstage and slapped Rock across the face, then returned to his seat and told Rock, twice, to "Keep my wife's name out [of] your fucking mouth!" While later accepting the Best Actor award for King Richard, Smith apologized to the Academy and the other nominees, but not to Rock. Rock decided not to press charges against Smith. On April 8, 2022, the Academy made an announcement on a letter sent by president David Rubin and CEO Dawn Hudson informing the public that Will Smith is banned from the Oscars for 10 years in result from the slap.

Refusals of the award
Some winners critical of the Academy Awards have boycotted the ceremonies and refused to accept their Oscars. The first to do so was screenwriter Dudley Nichols (Best Writing in 1935 for The Informer). Nichols boycotted the 8th Academy Awards ceremony because of conflicts between the Academy and the Writers' Guild. Nichols eventually accepted the 1935 award three years later, at the 1938 ceremony. Nichols was nominated for three further Academy Awards during his career.

George C. Scott became the second person to refuse his award (Best Actor in 1970 for Patton) at the 43rd Academy Awards ceremony. Scott described it as a "meat parade," saying, "I don't want any part of it."

The third person to refuse the award was Marlon Brando, who refused his award (Best Actor for 1972's The Godfather), citing the film industry's discrimination and mistreatment of Native Americans. At the 45th Academy Awards ceremony, Brando asked actress and civil rights activist Sacheen Littlefeather to read a 15-page speech in his place, detailing his criticisms, for which there was booing and cheering by the audience. Littlefeather was much later discovered to have falsely misrepresented her ancestry as Native American, that is, she was found to be a pretendian.

Disqualifications
Seven films have had nominations revoked before the official award ceremony:
 The Circus (1928) – The film was voluntarily removed by the Academy from competitive categories, to award Charlie Chaplin a special award.
 Hondo (1953) – Removed from the Best Story ballot after letters from the producer and nominee questioned its inclusion in the category.
 High Society (1955) – Withdrawn from screenwriting ballot after being mistaken for the 1956 movie of the same title.
 The Godfather (1972) – Initially nominated for eleven awards, its nomination for Best Original Score was revoked after it was discovered that its main theme was very similar to music that the score's composer had written for an earlier film. None of its other nominations were revoked, and it received three Oscars, including Best Picture.
 A Place in the World (1992) – Removed from the Best Foreign Language Film ballot after it was discovered that the country which submitted the film exercised insufficient artistic control.
 Alone Yet Not Alone (2014) – The film's title song, "Alone Yet Not Alone," was removed from the Best Original Song ballot after Bruce Broughton was found to have improperly contacted other members of the academy's musical branch; this was the first time that a film was removed from a ballot for ethical reasons.
 13 Hours: The Secret Soldiers of Benghazi (2017) - Sound mixer Greg P. Russell's nomination was rescinded one day before the Awards when it was discovered he had improperly contacted voters by telephone. In this case, the nominations for the other three nominated sound mixers, Gary Summers, Jeffrey J. Haboush and Mac Ruth, were allowed to stand.

One film was disqualified after winning the award, and had the winner return the Oscar:
 Young Americans (1969) – Initially won the award for Best Documentary Feature, but was later revoked after it was revealed that it had opened theatrically prior to the eligibility period.

One film had its nomination revoked after the award ceremony when it had not won the Oscar:
 Tuba Atlantic (2011) – Its nomination for Best Live Action Short Film was revoked when it was discovered that the film had aired on television in 2010, before its theatrical release.

Associated events

The following events are closely associated with the annual Academy Awards:

 BAFTA Awards
 César Awards
 David di Donatello Awards
 Goya Awards
 Nominees luncheon
 Governors Awards
 The 25th Independent Spirit Awards (2010), usually held in Santa Monica, California the Saturday before the Oscars, marked the first time it was moved to a Friday and a change of venue to L.A. Live
 The annual "Night Before," traditionally held at the Beverly Hills Hotel, begun in 2002 and generally known as the party of the season, benefits the Motion Picture & Television Fund, which operates a retirement home for SAG actors in the San Fernando Valley
 Elton John AIDS Foundation Academy Award Party airs the awards live at the nearby Pacific Design Center
 The Governors Ball is the Academy's official after-party, including dinner (until 2011), and is adjacent to the awards-presentation venue
 The Vanity Fair after-party, historically at the former Morton's restaurant, has been at the Sunset Tower since 2009
 Ariel Award in Mexico

Presenter and performer gifts
It has become a tradition to give out gift bags to the presenters and performers at the Oscars. In recent years, these gifts have also been extended to award nominees and winners. The value of each of these gift bags can reach into the tens of thousands of dollars. In 2014, the value was reported to be as high as US$80,000. The value has risen to the point where the U.S. Internal Revenue Service issued a statement regarding the gifts and their taxable status.
Oscar gift bags have included vacation packages to Hawaii and Mexico and Japan, a private dinner party for the recipient and friends at a restaurant, videophones, a four-night stay at a hotel, watches, bracelets, spa treatments, bottles of vodka, maple salad dressing, weight-loss gummie candy and up to $25,000 worth of cosmetic treatments and rejuvenation procedures such as lip fillers and chemical peels from New York City facial plastic surgeon Konstantin Vasyukevich. Some of the gifts have even had a "risque" element to them; in 2014, the adult products retailer Adam & Eve had a "Secret Room Gifting Suite." Celebrities visiting the gifting suite included Judith Hoag, Carolyn Hennesy, Kate Linder, Chris Mulkey, Jim O'Heir and John Salley.

Television ratings and advertisement prices

From 2006 onwards, results are Live+SD; all previous years are live viewing.

Notable highest wins and nominees

By films 

The following nominees received at least 10 nominations:

The following winners received at least 5 awards (including non-competitive):

By franchises 

The following nominees received at least 5 nominations:

The following winners received at least 2 awards:

By people 

The following nominees received at least 5 nominations:

The following winners received at least 3 awards (including non-competitive):

See also

 List of film awards
 List of actors with Academy Award nominations
 List of superlative Academy Award winners and nominees
 List of Academy Award Winners for Best Picture, Director, Actor and Actress

Footnotes

References

Further reading
 Brokaw, Lauren (2010). "Wanna see an Academy Awards invite? We got it along with all the major annual events surrounding the Oscars". Los Angeles: The Daily Truffle.
 
  
 
 
 Wright, Jon (2007). The Lunacy of Oscar: The Problems with Hollywood's Biggest Night. Thomas Publishing, Inc.

External links

 
 
 
 
 Official Academy Awards Database (searchable)

 
1929 establishments in California
Performing arts trophies
American annual television specials
American film awards
Annual events in Los Angeles County, California
Awards established in 1929
Cinema of Southern California
Events in Los Angeles
Culture of Hollywood, Los Angeles
American live television shows